Gerard Marshall Vaughan (born 1 December 1946) is a former Australian politician.

He was born in Glen Huntly to David Arthur Vaughan and Mary Therese, née Russell. He attended state and Catholic schools and received an Associate Diploma of Chemical Engineering from the Royal Melbourne Institute of Technology in 1966. He worked as a chemical engineer with Australian Portland Cement Ltd. from 1967 to 1968, when he received a Bachelor of Education (Honours) from Monash University, followed by a Master of Engineering Science in 1971. He received a Diploma of Education from the State College of Victoria in 1973 and a PhD from Monash University in 1978. From 1968 to 1972 he was a research student and tutor in Monash University's Chemical Engineering Department, becoming a lecturer at Swinburne University of Technology in 1975. From 1977 to 1979 he was a research scientist with CSIRO's Mineral Engineering Division.

A Labor Party member since 1971, he ran unsuccessfully for the Victorian Legislative Assembly seat of Glenhuntly in 1976 but won the seat in 1979. He transferred to Clayton in 1985 following Glenhuntly's abolition. He served on a number of committees but was never promoted from the backbench, and he lost preselection to Hong Lim in 1996.

References

1946 births
Living people
Australian Labor Party members of the Parliament of Victoria
Members of the Victorian Legislative Assembly
RMIT University alumni
Australian chemical engineers
Monash University alumni
People from Glen Huntly, Victoria
Politicians from Melbourne
Scientists from Melbourne
CSIRO people
20th-century Australian scientists
20th-century Australian politicians